Fujiwara no Kamatari (藤原 鎌足, 614 – November 14, 669), also known as , was a Japanese politician who, together with Prince Nakano Ōe (later Emperor Tenji), carried out the Taika Reform. He is the founder of the Fujiwara clan, the most powerful aristocratic family in Japan during Nara and Heian periods. He, along with the Mononobe clan, was a supporter of Shinto and fought the introduction of Buddhism to Japan. The Soga clan, defenders of Buddhism in the Asuka period, defeated Kamatari and the Mononobe clan and Buddhism became the dominant religion of the imperial court. Kamatari, along with Prince Naka no Ōe, later Emperor Tenji (626–672), launched the Taika Reform of 645, which centralized and strengthened the central government. Just before his death he received the surname Fujiwara and the rank Taishōkan from Emperor Tenji, thus establishing the Fujiwara clan.

Biography
Kamatari was born to the Nakatomi clan, an aristocratic kin group claiming descent from their ancestral god Ame-no-Koyane. He was the son of Nakatomi no Mikeko, and named Nakatomi no Kamatari (中臣 鎌足) at birth. His early life and exploits are described in the 8th century clan history Tōshi Kaden (藤氏家伝).

He was a friend and supporter of the Prince Naka no Ōe, later Emperor Tenji. Kamatari was the head of the Jingi no Haku, or Shinto ritualists; as such, he was one of the chief opponents of the increasing power and prevalence of Buddhism in the court, and in the nation. As a result, in 645, Prince Naka no Ōe and Kamatari made a coup d'état in the court. They slew Soga no Iruka who had a strong influence over Empress Kōgyoku; thereafter, Iruka's father, Soga no Emishi, committed suicide.

Empress Kōgyoku was forced to abdicate in favor of her younger brother, who became Emperor Kōtoku; Kōtoku then appointed Kamatari naidaijin (内大臣, Inner Minister).

Kamatari was a leader in the development of what became known as the Taika Reforms, a major set of reforms based on Chinese models and aimed at strengthening Imperial power. He acted as one of the principal editors responsible for the development of the Japanese legal code known as Sandai-kyaku-shiki, sometimes referred to as the Rules and Regulations of the Three Generations.

During his life Kamatari continued to support Prince Naka no Ōe, who became Emperor Tenji in 661. Tenji granted him the highest rank Taishōkan (or Daishokukan) (大織冠) and a new clan name, Fujiwara (藤原), as honors.

Legacy

Kamatari's son was Fujiwara no Fuhito. Kamatari's nephew, Nakatomi no Omimaro became head of Ise Shrine, and passed down the Nakatomi name.

In the 13th century, the main line of the Fujiwara family split into five houses: Konoe, Takatsukasa, Kujō, Nijō and Ichijō. These five families in turn provided regents for the Emperors, and were thus known as the Five Regent Houses. The Tachibana clan (samurai) also claimed descent from the Fujiwara. Emperor Montoku of the Taira clan was descended through his mother to the Fujiwara.

Until the marriage of the Crown Prince Hirohito (posthumously Emperor Shōwa) to Princess Kuni Nagako (posthumously Empress Kōjun) in January 1924, the principal consorts of emperors and crown princes had always been recruited from one of the Sekke Fujiwara. Imperial princesses were often married to Fujiwara lords - throughout a millennium at least. As recently as Emperor Shōwa's third daughter, the late former Princess Takanomiya (Kazoku), and Prince Mikasa's elder daughter, the former Princess Yasuko, married into Takatsukasa and Konoe families, respectively. Empress Shōken was a descendant of the Fujiwara clan and through Hosokawa Gracia of the Minamoto clan. Likewise a daughter of the last Tokugawa Shōgun married a second cousin of Emperor Shōwa.

Among Kamatari's descendants are Fumimaro Konoe  the 34th/38th/39th Prime Minister of Japan and Konoe's grandson Morihiro Hosokawa  the 79th Prime Minister of Japan (who is also a descendant of the Hosokawa clan via the Ashikaga clan of the Minamoto clan).

Historic sites

Abuyama Kofun 
Abuyama Kofun, a megalithic tomb in Takatsuki and Ibaraki, Osaka has been identified as Fujiwara no Kamatari's tomb. The tomb and a mummy buried inside a coffin were first discovered in 1934. 50 years later, radiographic images and samples taken at the time were examined uncovering a mummy wrapped in gold thread. The kanmuri headwear found in the tomb indicates that the person buried was a noble of the highest rank Taishokkan. It was concluded that it is highly likely that the tomb was dedicated to Kamatari. According to the analysis, the mummified person had a strong bone structure and an athletic body, with the so-called pitcher's elbow. The cause of death was complications from injuries to the vertebral column and lumbar vertebrae sustained from a fall from horseback or a high ground. The injury is thought to have left the lower body paralyzed and caused secondary complications such as pneumonia or urinary tract infection. The cause of death matches with that of Kamatari's, whom is recorded to have died from a fall from horseback.

Higashinara site 
In 2014, the Ibaraki City Education Committee announced that ancient sen bricks discovered at Higashinara site in Ibaraki, Osaka match with the bricks found in Abuyama Kofun. The site is believed to have been the location of Mishima Betsugyō, a villa where Kamatari stayed before the Isshi Incident which triggered the Taika Reform (645).

Family
 Father: Nakatomi no Mikeko (中臣御食子)
 Mother: Ōtomo no Chisen-no-iratsume (大伴智仙娘), daughter of Otomo no Kuiko (大伴囓子). Also known as "Ōtomo-bunin" (大伴夫人).
 Main wife: Kagami no Ōkimi (鏡王女, ?-683)
 Wife: Kurumamochi no Yoshiko-no-iratsume (車持与志古娘), daughter of Kurumamochi no Kuniko (車持国子).
 1st son: Jōe (定恵, 643–666), buddhist monk who traveled to China.
 2nd son: Fujiwara no Fuhito (藤原不比等, 659–720)
 Children with unknown mother:' Daughter: Fujiwara no Hikami-no-iratsume (藤原氷上娘, ?–682), Bunin of Emperor Tenmu, mother of Princess Tajima.
 Daughter: Fujiwara no Ioe-no-iratsume (藤原五百重娘), Bunin of Emperor Tenmu, wife of Fujiwara no Fuhito and mother of Prince Niitabe and Fujiwara no Maro.
 Daughter: Fujiwara no Mimimotoji (藤原耳面刀自), Bunin of Emperor Kōbun, mother of Princess Ichishi-hime (壱志姫王).
 Daughter: Fujiwara no Tome/Tone-no-iratsume (藤原斗売娘), wife of Nakatomi no Omimaro (中臣意美麻呂), mother of Nakatomi no Azumahito (中臣東人).

Popular culture
 Portrayed by Noh Seung-jin in the 2012–2013 KBS1 TV series Dream of the Emperor.

See also
 Tōshi Kaden, a bibliographic record

References

Sources
 Bauer, Mikael. The History of the Fujiwara House. Kent, UK: Renaissance Books, 2020. . 
Brinkley, Frank and Dairoku Kikuchi. (1915). A History of the Japanese People from the Earliest Times to the End of the Meiji Era. New York: Encyclopædia Britannica. OCLC 413099
 Nussbaum, Louis-Frédéric and Käthe Roth. (2005).  Japan encyclopedia. Cambridge: Harvard University Press. ;  OCLC 58053128
 Titsingh, Isaac. (1834). Nihon Ōdai Ichiran''; ou,  Annales des empereurs du Japon.  Paris: Royal Asiatic Society, Oriental Translation Fund of Great Britain and Ireland. OCLC 5850691

External links

614 births
669 deaths
Fujiwara clan
People of Asuka-period Japan
Konoe family
People from Ibaraki, Osaka
Man'yō poets
Deified Japanese people
Buddhism in the Asuka period
Japanese Shintoists
Opposition to Buddhism